Chuck Weber is an American politician who served in the Kansas House of Representatives as a Republican from 2016 to 2018. 

Weber worked as a TV journalist before entering politics. He was appointed to the seat left vacant by the resignation of Steve Brunk, taking office on January 11, 2016. He won a full term in his own right in the 2016 elections, running unopposed in the primary election and taking 61% of the vote against Democrat Patty Beamer in November.

In 2018, Weber initially announced a run for re-election; however, he withdrew from the race and resigned his seat to become a lobbyist. As of 2023, Weber works as the director of the Kansas Catholic Conference, an organization that "serves as the official voice of the Roman Catholic Church in Kansas on matters of public policy".

References

Living people
Year of birth missing (living people)
Place of birth missing (living people)
Republican Party members of the Kansas House of Representatives
21st-century American politicians
Politicians from Wichita, Kansas
Catholics from Kansas